So You Think You Can Dance Australia is an Australian version of the American reality dance competition So You Think You Can Dance. The show is hosted by Carrie Bickmore, with judges Paula Abdul, Shannon Holtzapffel, Jason Gilkison and Aaron Cash.

The first season began airing on Sunday, 3 February 2008 at 7.30 pm and continued on Sundays and Mondays until the final on 27 April 2008. The program's second season began airing on Sunday, 1 February 2009 and continued on Sundays and Mondays until the final on 26 April 2009. The third season began on 31 January 2010 and continued on Wednesdays and Thursdays until 21 April 2010. The show was previously hosted by former The X Factor judge Natalie Bassingthwaighte, with Jason Coleman, Matt Lee and Bonnie Lythgoe acting as the judges.

Through telephone and SMS text voting, viewers have chosen nineteen-year-old Broadway dancer Jack Chambers, eighteen-year-old Ballet dancer Talia Fowler and eighteen-year-old Contemporary dancer Robbie Kmetoni as Australia's Favourite Dancer. The eligible age-range for contestants is currently 18–35 years old.

In July 2010 it was announced Network Ten had cancelled So You Think You Can Dance Australia in favour of a new musical/dancing format for 2011. However, Network Ten says they are in continual discussions with production company FremantleMedia Australia and Conrad Sewell Productions regarding the format's future. In 2011, rumors began to appear in the Australian media industry press that the series would be returned to broadcast, likely on original home network Ten.  The show returned with a fourth series broadcast on Network Ten starting on 9 February 2014.

Series overview

Overview of format and presentation by season

Grand finalists

Season 1 (2008)

Auditions for the first season were held during July and August 2008 in Perth, Brisbane, Melbourne, Adelaide and Sydney. After being selected, through either an impressive initial audition or after a choreography workshop, the top 100 contestants spent a week in Sydney for more auditions, ultimately forming a Top 20. Auditions began on 9 October 2007 in Brisbane, Queensland and ended in Sydney, New South Wales on 6 November 2007. A 600-seat arena was constructed in Sydney for the finals. Jack Chambers was announced as the winner on 26 April 2008. Chambers won $200,000 prize money and the title of Australia's Favourite Dancer, with Rhys Bobridge, Kate Wormald, Demi Sorono finishing as runner-up, third place and fourth place respectively.  Several finalists later performed during the 2008 Australian Idol grand final, as well as Ten's New Year's Eve broadcast.

Season 2 (2009)

Auditions for the second season were held during September and November 2008. Dancers auditioning were requested to bring pre-approved copyright music CDs because of music licensing issues. Judges hoped that season 2 would see more industry dancers auditioning after the favourable response to the first season of the show. Repeats of the performance and results show aired a week later on MuchMusic. Talia Fowler was announced the winner on 27 April 2009. Fowler received $200,000 prize money, the title of Australia's Favourite Dancer and the opportunity to perform at the finale of America's version of So You Think You Can Dance, while Ben Veitch came 4th place, then Amy Campbell came 3rd place, while lastly Charlie Bartley was named runner-up.

Nigel Lythgoe and Mary Murphy made separate appearances in this season as guest judges.

Season 3 (2010)

The third season premiered on 31 January 2010. Robbie Kmetoni was announced the winner on 21 May 2010. Kmetoni received $200,000 prize money and the title of Australia's Favourite Dancer. Furthermore, he will have the opportunity to choose from three exclusive dance contracts (including Australian Dance Theatre, Hairspray and Burn the Floor) to perform throughout Australia and overseas, While Robbie Kmetoni's friend Jessie Hesketh was named runner-up, then Ivy Heeney came 3rd place, while lastly Phillipe Witana came 4th place and the first season where each contestants were in the bottom three or four.

Cancellation and Revival
In July 2010, it was announced Network Ten would not recommission So You Think You Can Dance Australia for a 2011 season. It follows media speculation the show had been cancelled, and talks Ten had a new "shiny floor" format to reveal. Ten advised FremantleMedia Australia that it would opt out of format, but didn't rule out a future return. Instead Ten was to develop a local version of British talent show Don't Stop Believing, inspired by the success of Glee. Don't Stop Believing was instead to be produced by Shine Australia, which is headed by former FremantleMedia Australia executives. Plans were halted late 2010, with the show cancelled before starting.

In October 2011, Ten began airing ads for So You Think You Can Dance Australia implying it would be returning soon, but Ten were yet to release details on when.   In February 2012 rumors began to emerge in the Australian media press that former Australia's Next Top Model host Sarah Murdoch had been approached to take over hosting duties for a revival of the show as Natalie Bassingthwaighte has moved on to a judging position for Australia's iteration of music talent show The X-Factor who is replacing Natalie Imbruglia.  The show was also rumored to be returning to its original network, Channel Ten.  These rumors ultimately proved to be inaccurate when Ten revealed that it had engaged Murdoch to host a different dance-themed show entitled Everybody Dance Now. Ultimately the show did return to broadcast on Network Ten, airing season 4 in the spring of 2014 after a four-year hiatus.

Season 4 (2014)

The show resumed airing on 9 February 2014 featuring a shortened format with one show broadcast a week, similar to the U.S. seasons 9 and 10.  The new format also eliminated the open audition process, with the season opening at the Top 100 stage, these dancers having been selected via audition tapes and processes not portrayed in any episode, a format atypical of So You Think You Can Dance shows, which generally show the contestant selection process from earlier auditions on.   The show also featured an entire change in judging cast, with Paula Abdul, Aaron Cashacting, Jason Gilkison, and Shannon Holtzapffel filling the seats of the panel, as well as a change in host, with Carrie Bickmore presenting.   The fourth season concluded on Thursday, 1 May with contemporary dancers Michael Dameski and Lauren Seymour taking 1st and 2nd places respectively.  To date, neither Network Ten nor the show's producers have made a statement as to whether the show will be returning for a fifth season.

Ratings
3 February 2008 premiere of So You Think You Can Dance Australia attracted a peak audience of 2.15 million viewers. The show was the night's top-rating program, averaging 1.83 million viewers over its timeslot. The following two audition episodes also put up respectable figures, peaking at 2.04 million and 1.94 million viewers respectively. The Sunday night Top 100 show averaged 1.6 million viewers to become the most watched program of the night.

After its debut, the weekly performance show averaged around 1.5 million viewers. The series one finale averaged 1.8 million viewers, peaking at 2.2 million viewers nationwide. Over 50 per cent of Ten's key 18–49 age demographic had tuned into the show. In season 3, ratings further slumped to a below million average, after which the show was cancelled.  Season 4's revival of the series had smaller viewership still, with most episodes pulling less than a million viewers, and several seeing viewership as low as 300,000.

Controversy
Jason Coleman has been questioned over his position as judge on the show, with members of the dance community accusing him of being under qualified, and using incorrect jargon on the show, calling a pivot a promenade. Eliminated contestant Marko Panzic also accused Coleman of playing favourites. Critics also cite a possible conflict of interest due to Coleman's external business relationship with choreographer Kelly Aykers.

Coleman has responded to these criticisms, saying: "Mate, this is just nit-picking. With this show a pivot is the same thing as a promenade. In my world it's called a promenade, in the ballroom dancing world it's called a pivot. I'm aware of the differences but I don't have time in my minute-and-a-half speech to explain that." In response to the Aykers issue, he said: "Kelly Aykers has delivered three great routines. I would never put myself in a position where I would compliment a person's work because they are my friend. If the work deserves a compliment it will receive it, if it does not, it will not."

The show has also received criticism from the Australian dance community and mainstream media over the representation of the art of dance on the show. In one example, commentator Valerie Lawson observes that "So You Think You Can Dance Australia goes further. Its very success ... is compromising dance as a performance art. The audience is led to believe that the most obvious effort, the most athletic of tricks, and the most vulgar of moves, represent dance at its best. As hips swivel, the studio audience cheers. When a guy lifts a girl with as much finesse as a forklift truck the audience roars its approval."

On two occasions the show has accidentally broadcast profanities during the PG-rated live show. On the first occasion, Ten issued an apology for a "indistinct and muffled" profanity uttered during the first elimination show, and promised that "efforts [have been] redoubled to prevent such an incident happening again." Nonetheless, when Sermsah Bin Saad was making his speech after being eliminated, he accidentally swore on national television, saying, "You guys are so fucking awesome!". At that time, Sermsah didn't realise that it was on live and apologised after finding out his mistake. In this case the profane word was censored during broadcast.

See also
Dance on television

References

External links
So You Think You Can Dance Australia Top 20 Finalist biographies
 So You Think You Can Dance, Sydney Dance Company Studio teachers and dancers

 
Network 10 original programming
2008 Australian television series debuts
2010 Australian television series endings
2014 Australian television series debuts
2014 Australian television series endings
Television series by Fremantle (company)
Television shows set in Sydney
English-language television shows
Australian television series revived after cancellation
Dance in Australia
Australian television series based on American television series